Kilisa is a village in the Lori Province of Armenia, belonging to the community of Halavar. The village was populated by Azerbaijanis before the exodus of Azerbaijanis from Armenia after the outbreak of the Nagorno-Karabakh conflict.

References

External links 

Populated places in Lori Province